is a private women's junior college in the city of Nara in Nara Prefecture, Japan. It was established in 1965.

External links
 Official website 

Educational institutions established in 1965
Private universities and colleges in Japan
Universities and colleges in Nara Prefecture
Japanese junior colleges
1965 establishments in Japan